Cambio is a Colombian-based social, political and economics magazine. Founded with the name Cambio 16 it was later sold and Cambio in 1998 to nobel laureate Gabriel Garcia Marquez and other associates. In 2006 the magazine was sold to "Casa Editorial El Tiempo", the owner of Colombia's El Tiempo newspaper. The magazine ceased publication in February 2010.

Cambio returned to publication in 2022 in a digital-only format; people who have collaborated with it include Carolina Sanín.

History
Cambio was founded as Cambio 16 América by Colombian journalist Daniel Samper Pizano and Spanish associates called the "sociedad empresarial española "Grupo 16"" who owned the Cambio 16 version of this magazine in Spain and were trying to establish a second major weekly magazine in Colombia to compete with Semana.

Cambio 16 Américas was released on June 14, 1993, under the direction of Darío Restrepo Vélez and Patricia Lara Salive as chief executive officer of the board of directors. Samper worked as an editor. The owner and general director was the Spanish Juan Tomás de Salas.

The first editorial committee was headed by Daniel Samper Pizano, Consuelo Mendoza, Guillermo Cortés, Gabriel Jaramillo, Gloria Zea, Reinaldo Cabrera and Patricia Lara Salive. It had a number of contributors like , Alberto Donadío, Germán Espinosa, Eduardo Escobar, Alfredo Molano Bravo, Darío Jaramillo Agudelo and Juan Ballesta.

It later went through many image and directive renovations when Patricia Lara Salive became an associate in 1996; Rafael de Nicolás, Fabio Echeverri Correa and Dionisio Ibáñez were appointed to the board of directors. The editorial team was replaced by Guillermo Ángulo, Reinaldo Cabrera, Hernando Gómez Buendía, Gabriel Jaramillo, Consuelo Mendoza, among others and the general direction of Carlos Lemoine Amaya. 

Cambio was then sold to the society Abrenuncio S.A. from Bogotá on November 25, 1998. The society was conformed by nobel laureate Gabriel Garcia Marquez, his wife Mercedes Barcha, Maria Elvira Samper, Roberto Pombo, Mauricio Vargas Linares, among others. In 2006 the magazine was sold to Casa Editorial el Tiempo.

References

 Biblioteca Luis Angel Arango; Imagen y discurso: Construcción de sentido en las portadas de las revistas Semana y Cambio 1998-2004

1993 establishments in Colombia
2010 disestablishments in Colombia
Magazines published in Colombia
Defunct magazines published in Colombia
Magazines established in 1993
Magazines disestablished in 2010
Mass media in Bogotá
Monthly magazines
Spanish-language magazines